Benjamin Franklin Meyers (July 6, 1833 – August 11, 1918) was a Democratic member of the U.S. House of Representatives from Pennsylvania.
Benjamin F. Meyers was born near New Centerville, Pennsylvania.  He attended Somerset Academy and Jefferson College in Canonsburg, Pennsylvania (now Washington and Jefferson College in Washington, Pennsylvania).  He studied law, was admitted to the bar and commenced practice in 1855.  He served as a member of the Pennsylvania State House of Representatives in 1864.  He was a delegate to the Democratic National Conventions of 1864, 1880, 1884, 1888, 1892, 1896, and 1900.  He was the editor of the Bedford Gazette and in 1868 of the Harrisburg Daily Patriot.

Meyers was elected as a Democrat to the Forty-second Congress.  He was an unsuccessful candidate for reelection in 1872.  He served as postmaster of Harrisburg, Pennsylvania, by appointment of President Grover Cleveland from 1886 to 1891.  He was publisher of the Daily Star Independent in Harrisburg.  He was engaged in public utilities, and died in Harrisburg in 1918.  Interment in Harrisburg Cemetery.

Sources

The Political Graveyard

External links

1833 births
1918 deaths
Burials at Harrisburg Cemetery
Pennsylvania lawyers
Washington & Jefferson College alumni
19th-century American newspaper publishers (people)
Politicians from Harrisburg, Pennsylvania
Democratic Party members of the United States House of Representatives from Pennsylvania
Pennsylvania postmasters
19th-century American politicians
Journalists from Pennsylvania
19th-century American lawyers